The London Declaration on Combating Antisemitism is a declaration which asserts the need for global cooperation in the fight against Antisemitism by drawing "The Democratic world’s attention to the resurgence of Antisemitism as a potent force in politics, international affairs and society". It was signed on February 17, 2009, in Lancaster House, during the Conference and Summit of the Inter-parliamentary Coalition for Combating Antisemitism, by some of the world's leading parliamentarians.

Background

The first annual conference of the "Inter-parliamentary Coalition for Combating Antisemitism" (ICCA) was held in London, England in February, 2009. It brought together over 100 parliamentarians and NGO representatives from 35 different countries to discuss the uprising of contemporary antisemitism (i.e. old and New Antisemitism) around the world, by sharing knowledge, experience and recommendations. By the end of the first annual conference, the Parliamentarians "call upon national governments, parliaments, international institutions, political and civic leaders, NGOs, and civil society to affirm democratic and human values, build societies based on respect and citizenship and combat any manifestations of antisemitism and discrimination". The conference concluded with the signing of the London Declaration on Combating Antisemitism.

Content
The declaration deals with 6 fundamental issues:

Challenging Antisemitism

Prohibitions

Identifying the threat

Education, awareness and training

Community Support

Media and the Internet

Responses
Britain's prime minister, Gordon Brown, who was the first to sign the declaration, said:
“So many of the principles it enshrines are already things we are doing here in Britain, and while I’m proud of the bold action Britain has taken to combat Antisemitism such as improved reporting, prosecutions for anti-Semitic Internet hate and the funding of Holocaust education in schools, there is no room for complacency [...] I encourage other heads of government to become signatories to this historic agreement. Together our renewed efforts can rid the world of this ancient virus."

Hannah Rosenthal, special envoy to monitor and combat Antisemitism, said at the 9th Biennial Stephen S. Weinstein Holocaust Symposium that:
"This document is important not only because of what it says, but because it started an intentional conversation about the global ills of anti-Semitism."

References

Opposition to antisemitism